Evare Athagadu is a 2003 Telugu-language film starring Vallabha, Priyamani, Jaya Sheel, and K. Viswanath. This was the debut film for both Priyamani and Vallabha, the son of Telugu film producer, K. S. Rama Rao.

Plot 

Sunny (Vallabha) and Sneha (Jaya) are childhood friends. When Sunny joins Sneha's event management company, he falls in love with her. In a flashback narration, Sneha reveals the sad experiences of her life.

As time passes, Sneha begins to fall in love with Sunny but is hesitant to tell him. Meanwhile, Sunny leaves for the United States, where he meets Rekha (Priya Mani) and proposes to her. Sneha is shocked to see Sunny engaged to Rekha upon his return but agrees to be the event manager for his wedding. Sunny soon realizes Sneha's love for him.

Cast 

Vallabha as Sunny
Priyamani as Rekha
Jaya Seal as Sneha
Vasu
 K. Viswanath as Rekha's grandfather
 Tanikella Bharani
 Ahuti Prasad
 Dharmavarapu Subramanyam
 Brahmanandam
 L. B. Sriram
 Mallikarjuna Rao
 Sunil
Chitram Seenu
Duvvasi Mohan
 Subbaraya Sharma
 Delhi Rajeswari
 Sana
 Ramya Sri
 Apoorva 
 Suman Setty
 Gundu Hanumantha Rao

Soundtrack

Soundtrack was composed by M. M. Keeravani and released on Aditya Music.

References

External links
Listen Evare Atagaadu Songs
News Film review on The Hindu

2002 films
2000s Telugu-language films